The Medal for Noble Deeds may refer too:

Medal for Noble Deeds (Denmark), established in 1793
Medal for Noble Deeds (Sweden), established in 1832